The Hildreth Covered Bridge, also known as the "Hills Covered Bridge" or "Lafaber's Mill Bridge," is a historic covered bridge in Washington County, Ohio, United States. Construction of the Hildreth Bridge was a long process: the most significant amount of work was done on the bridge in 1878, but the entire construction process occurred between 1871 and 1881. The identity of its builder is unknown.

One of three covered bridges that span the Little Muskingum, the Hildreth Bridge is a single-span wooden Howe truss bridge that rests on abutments and piers of ashlar.  It features structural elements such as a metal roof, vertical siding, and portals with battens.  Due to its great height above the stream below, the bridge has been seen by locals as one of the most impressive of the region's many covered bridges.  In 1978, the Hildreth Bridge was listed on the National Register of Historic Places, qualifying both because of its place in local history and because of its historically significant construction.

References

External links

Bridges completed in 1881
Covered bridges on the National Register of Historic Places in Ohio
Bridges in Washington County, Ohio
National Register of Historic Places in Washington County, Ohio
Wooden bridges in Ohio
Tourist attractions in Washington County, Ohio
Road bridges on the National Register of Historic Places in Ohio
Howe truss bridges in the United States